Tatyana Andreyevna Savelyeva (born 22 May 1947) is a retired Russian backstroke swimmer. She competed in four events at the 1964 and 1968 Summer Olympics and won a bronze medal in the 4 × 100 m medley relay in 1964; in other events she did not reach the finals. During her career she set six national records and won five national titles in the 100 m (1964–1966) and 200 m backstroke (1967–1968).

She graduated from the Saint Petersburg State Polytechnical University. After marriage she changed her last name to Gladysheva.

References

1947 births
Living people
Soviet female swimmers
Female backstroke swimmers
Olympic swimmers of the Soviet Union
Swimmers at the 1964 Summer Olympics
Swimmers at the 1968 Summer Olympics
Olympic bronze medalists for the Soviet Union
Olympic bronze medalists in swimming
Medalists at the 1964 Summer Olympics